"Let's Stay Together" is a song by American singer Al Green from his 1972 album of the same name. It was produced and recorded by Willie Mitchell, and mixed by Mitchell and Terry Manning. Released as a single in 1971, "Let's Stay Together" reached number 1 on the Billboard Hot 100, and remained on the chart for 16 weeks and also topped Billboard's R&B chart for nine weeks. Billboard ranked it as the number 11 song of 1972.

It was ranked the 60th greatest song of all time by Rolling Stone magazine on their 2004 list of the 500 Greatest Songs of All Time, and has been covered by numerous other performers, most notably Tina Turner.

It was selected by the Library of Congress as a 2010 addition to the National Recording Registry, which selects recordings annually that are "culturally, historically, or aesthetically significant". The song went on to claim the number 1 position on the Billboard Year-End chart as an R&B song for 1972.

Charts

Weekly charts

Year-end charts

Certifications

Tina Turner version

"Let's Stay Together" was later covered by Tina Turner, her second collaboration with the British Heaven 17 and British Electric Foundation production team after "Ball of Confusion" in 1982, and served as her comeback single in late 1983. Unlike Al Green's version, Turner sings verse 2 first, then verse 1 when the band starts playing.

Released by Capitol Records in November 1983, the single charted at number 6 in the UK (one place higher than Al Green's original) and became the third time she reached the UK top ten, the first two being with former husband Ike Turner on "River Deep, Mountain High" and "Nutbush City Limits". Following the US release in January 1984, the single reached number 26 on the Billboard Hot 100 and number 1 on the Billboard Dance Chart.

At the time, the song was the most successful solo single Turner had released. It was included on her multi-platinum selling album Private Dancer, released a few months later in the spring of 1984. The music video was directed by David Mallet. The cover photography was by Norman Seeff.

Personnel
Tina Turner – lead vocals
Gary Barnacle – saxophone
Glenn Gregory – background vocals
Rupert Hine – percussion
Frank Ricotti – percussion
Ray Russell – guitar
Martyn Ware – programming, electronic drums, arrangements, background vocals
Greg Walsh – programming, arrangements
Nick Plytas – piano, synthesizer

Production
Greg Walsh – producer & engineer
Martyn Ware – producer
Walter Samuel – engineer
Alan Yoshida – mastering
Akira Taguchi – compilation producer
Sam Gay – creative director
Roy Kohara – art direction
John O'Brien – design
Peter Ashworth – photography
Roger Davies – management
Chip Lightman – management

Track listing and formats
7" single
"Let's Stay Together" – 3:36
"I Wrote a Letter" – 3:24

12" single
"Let's Stay Together" (Extended Version) – 5:14
"I Wrote a Letter" – 3:24

Charts and certifications

Weekly charts

Year-end charts

Certifications and sales

Other cover versions
"Let's Stay Together" has been covered by:
 Isaac Hayes as B-side of the single "Soulsville" in 1972.
 Billy Paul on his 1972 album 360 Degrees of Billy Paul.
 Organist Ronnie Foster recorded an instrumental version for his 1972 studio album Two Headed Freap.
 Margie Joseph on her 1973 album Margie Joseph. She had also recorded in Memphis contemporaneous to Green, but offered a Philly-inspired version produced by Arif Mardin).
 Al Jarreau on his 1979 album Call Me.
 Jimmy Smith instrumental version on his 1972 album Root Down.
 The Rippingtons on their 1989 album Tourist in Paradise.
 Former Hong Kong singer Yvonne Lau Man-Kuen (Chinese: 劉文娟) covered it under the title "Don't leave gaps when young" (Chinese: 年輕不要留白) in 1991.
 An instrumental version very close to the Al Green original was recorded by The Memphis Horns on their 1992 album Flame Out.
 The Pasadenas covered the song as a 1992 non-album single.
 Roberta Flack on her 1994 album Roberta.
 Bobby Ross Avila on his 1995 album Into My Life.
 Shirley Bassey covered the song on her 1995 album Sings the Movies.
 Big Mountain on their 1997 album Free Up.
 Michael Bolton covered the song on his 1999 album Timeless: The Classics Vol. 2.
 Saxophonist Eric Alexander recorded a jazz instrumental version for his 1999 studio album Alexander the Great.
 Ms. Marilyn Marshall on her 1999 album Hold On.
 In 2002 Justin Guarini performed the song on the first season of American Idol.
 In 2003 Trenyce performed the song on the second season of American Idol and a version appears on the various artists compilation album American Idol Season 2: All-Time Classic American Love Songs.
 It was covered by English soul singer Lemar on his 2003 debut album Dedicated.
 In 2004 Leah LaBelle performed the song on the third season of American Idol.
 Boyz II Men on their 2004 covers album Throwback.
 In 2004, saxophonist Eric Darius performed a rendition of "Let's Stay Together". Eric's version was from the album Night on the Town.
 In 2005 Joseph Murena performed the song on the fourth season of American Idol.
 Michelle Williams on 2005 various artists compilation album GAP – Favorite Songs (Fall 2005).
 At Last performed it a cappella on the 2006 first season of America's Got Talent. 
 Donny Osmond on his album 2007 Love Songs of the '70s.
 Australian soul singer Guy Sebastian recorded a cover version on his 2007 covers album The Memphis Album.
 Brian Kennedy on his 2008 album Interpretations.
 Robin Thicke has covered the song live many times on his concerts at least since 2008.
 Ian Moss released a version of "Let's Stay Together" as the lead single from his 2009 sixth studio album, Soul on West 53rd.
 British singer Craig David covers his very own version of the song on his 2010 album Signed Sealed Delivered.
 On December 15, 2010, on The Sing-Off, it was performed a cappella by season 2 winners Committed.
 Seal on his 2011 album Soul 2.
 Lynda Carter covered this song for her 2011 album Crazy Little Things.
 In 2012 Elise Testone performed the song on the eleventh season of American Idol.
 Maroon 5 on their 2012 album Overexposed [Deluxe Limited Edition]
 American pop singer Katy Perry performed the song at Barack Obama Fundraising Concert in Best Buy Theater, New York City on October 7, 2012.
 Terry Manning on his 2015 album Heaven Knows.
 American indie rock band Low covered the song in 2018.
 Welsh ragga metal group Dub War covered the song in 2022 on their album Westgate Under Fire, as "Stay Together".

Appearance in other media
The song has been used in the films:
 Quentin Tarantino film Pulp Fiction (1994).
 The John Singleton film Higher Learning (1995).
 The 2000 film Down to You.
 The 2003 romantic comedy film How to Lose a Guy in 10 Days
 The 2004 film Jersey Girl.
 The 2004 film Hellboy.
 The 2005 film Munich.
 The 2012 romantic comedy Hope Springs.

The song has been featured in various television shows:
 It was performed in an episode of Ally McBeal (1997–2002).
 The song has featured twice in the UK version of Stars in Their Eyes. The first, notably by soul and swing singer George Anthony in 1998's episode 4 and also the series 9 Grand Final in the same year. 
 An instrumental version of the song appears in episode 23 of the anime adaptation of Monster (Japanese on September 8, 2004, and English on January 4, 2010).
 It was parodied by The Fringemunks to recap Fringe episode 2.06, "Earthling" (November 5, 2009).
 It was played in the Parks and Recreation episode "Road Trip" (May 12, 2011). During Leslie Knope and Ben Wyatt's road trip, as assigned by Chris Traeger, they listen to a series of unusual songs, until Let's Stay Together plays. It is later confirmed that Ann Perkins had burned the song in order to get them together.
 In 2011 Kermit Ruffins and his band cover the song in season 2, episode 9 "What Is New Orleans?" of the HBO series Treme.
 United States President Barack Obama performed a brief phrase of the song during an appearance at the Apollo Theater in New York City on January 19, 2012, for a campaign fundraiser that included Al Green as an opening act. In the week following, sales of Green's recording of the song increased by 490%.

See also
Billboard Year-End
Hot 100 number-one hits of 1972 (United States)
Number-one dance hits of 1984 (USA)
R&B number-one hits of 1972 (USA)

References

External links
 
 
 

1971 songs
1971 singles
1983 singles
2005 singles
Al Green songs
Capitol Records singles
Tina Turner songs
Billboard Hot 100 number-one singles
Cashbox number-one singles
Grammy Hall of Fame Award recipients
Songs written by Al Green
Songs written by Willie Mitchell (musician)
Songs written by Al Jackson Jr.
United States National Recording Registry recordings
Hi Records singles
Song recordings produced by Willie Mitchell (musician)
Music videos directed by David Mallet (director)